Peliococcus is a genus of true bugs belonging to the family Pseudococcidae.

The genus has almost cosmopolitan distribution.

Species:
 Peliococcus agriensis
 Peliococcus albertaccius Goux, 1990

References

Pseudococcidae